Route 58 is a  south–north state highway in southeastern Massachusetts. For all but its final , the route lies within Plymouth County. Its southern terminus is at Route 28 at the Rochester–Wareham town line and its northern terminus is at Route 18 in Weymouth. Along the way it intersect several major highways including Interstate 495 (I-495) in Wareham and U.S. Route 44 (US 44) in Carver.

Route description

Route 58 begins at Route 28 on the Rochester–Wareham town line.  The route follows the town line for approximately a tenth of a mile before being wholly in Wareham.  It then crosses I-495 before clipping the corner of Middleborough and re-entering Wareham for a short while before finally entering Carver.  For the first  of this route, none of the town line changes are signed.

The route turns northward through the town of Carver, passing Edaville Railroad and the King Richard's Faire grounds as well as the center of town.  In North Carver the town intersects U.S. Route 44 just west of where that route becomes a four-lane freeway.  Before the freeway was completed, the route had a short concurrency between its current exit ramps to Plymouth Road, where the route continued eastward to Plymouth.  Route 58 then passes through the small town of Plympton and into Halifax, where it intersects Route 106.  It then passes between the East and West Monponsett Ponds before crossing into Hanson.

In Hanson, Route 58 intersects Route 27 before sharing a  concurrency with Route 14, passing the Town Hall and Wampatuck Pond before splitting northwestward.  The route takes a few turns before entering Whitman, turning northward at a rotary into the town of Abington.  It intersects Route 123, the Plymouth/Kingston commuter rail line, and Route 139, all before ending just over the Weymouth town line at Route 18, just west of the former South Weymouth Naval Air Station site.

Route history
When first established in the late 1920s, Route 58 went from Wareham to Canton ending at Route 138. In Abington, instead of heading straight at the intersection with Route 123, the route went right, running concurrent along Centre Avenue until Spring Street where it turned left and crossed into Weymouth on Union Street. Route 58 then followed what would be the 1931-1959 routing of Route 128 through Weymouth (Columbian Street), Braintree (Columbian Street, Grove Street, Franklin Street, and West Street), Quincy (Blue Hill River Road), Milton (Blue Hill River Road, Hillside Street) and Canton (Royall Street) before ending at Route 138. In 1931, with the establishment of the new path of Route 128 from Dedham to Hingham, Route 58 was truncated back to Main Street in Weymouth continuing its modern path north of Route 123 to end at what is today the intersection with Route 18.

Major intersections

See also

References

The Roads of Massachusetts

External links

058
Abington, Massachusetts
Whitman, Massachusetts
Rochester, Massachusetts
Middleborough, Massachusetts
Wareham, Massachusetts
Carver, Massachusetts
Plympton, Massachusetts
Halifax, Massachusetts
Hanson, Massachusetts
Weymouth, Massachusetts
Transportation in Plymouth County, Massachusetts
Transportation in Norfolk County, Massachusetts